Diodotus may refer to:
Diodotus I, Seleucid satrap of Bactria
Diodotus II, Greco-Bactrian king, son of Diodotus I
Diodotus Tryphon, king of the Hellenistic Seleucid kingdom 142–138 BC
Diodotus the Stoic, stoic philosopher, and friend of Cicero
Diodotus the grammarian, who according to Diogenes Laërtius wrote a commentary on the works of Heraclitus.
Diodotus (son of Eucrates), ancient Athenian who opposed Cleon's proposal in 427 BC to kill all adult Mytilenean males and to enslave their women and children after the Mytilenean revolt